WKSL (97.9 FM) is a commercial radio station licensed to Neptune Beach, Florida, broadcasting to the Jacksonville metropolitan area. The station is owned and operated by iHeartMedia, Inc.   WKSL airs a Top 40/CHR radio format. WKSL carries two weekday syndicated programs, with Elvis Duran and the Morning Show from WHTZ New York City, and in middays, WKSL carries On Air with Ryan Seacrest based at KIIS-FM Los Angeles.

WKSL's studios and offices are located on Belfort Parkway in Jacksonville's Southside neighborhood.  The transmitter is in the Arlington neighborhood, on Hogan Road near Pottsburg Creek.

WKSL broadcasts in the HD Radio hybrid format.  The HD2 subchannel, which is simulcast on sister station WFXJ and FM translator W247CF (97.3 MHz), carries a Spanish news/talk format known as "Acción 97.3."  The HD3 subchannel, which is simulcast on FM translator W300CU (107.9 MHz), carries an urban gospel format known as "Praise 107.9."

History

Early history
The station was originally licensed to St. Augustine, Florida as WFOY-FM on 97.7 MHz, simulcasting WFOY.  In 1984, Shull Broadcasting bought WFOY-AM-FM and changed the FM to Hot AC WUVU "The View 97.7."  In 1992, WUVU moved to 97.9 MHz, upgrading its power to 50,000 watts.  It was sold to Paxson Broadcasting, which switched WUVU to WSTF (the former call sign what is now WJRR in Orlando) with an oldies format. On February 2, 1995, it flipped to Smooth Jazz as WFSJ-FM.

WFKS "97.9 KISS FM"
WFSJ switched formats to Rhythmic-leaning CHR at 3 p.m. on March 17, 2000, calling itself "97-9 KISS FM."  For a short time it used the call sign WGNE-FM. On July 3, 2000, the call letters changed to WFKS.

From 1994 to 2000, the WFKS call sign was used on 99.9 FM in Palatka, as CHR/Hot AC "99.9 Kiss FM." That station became country WGNE-FM in 2000 and was moved into the Jacksonville market by Renda Broadcasting in May 2005. It is now "99.9 Gator Country," competing with the current WKSL-FM's sister station, WQIK-FM.

Radio Now 97.9

On July 1, 2011, at Noon, after playing "Just Dance" by Lady Gaga featuring Colby O'Donis, WFKS launched into a "Flashback Weekend", playing hits that were popular from the station's 10-year existence, including 1990s songs.  The station began promoting "The End of Kiss" at 9 a.m. on the 5th. At that time, after playing "Bye Bye Bye" by *Nsync, WFKS relaunched as "Radio NOW 97-9", while tweaking its format to a more mainstream CHR. The first song on "Radio NOW" was "Kryptonite" by 3 Doors Down. On July 14, WFKS changed the call letters to WNWW to go with the "Radio NOW" branding.

Return to "KISS FM"
On November 1, 2013, after playing "We Are Young" by Fun featuring Janelle Monáe, WNWW returned to the "Kiss" branding as "97-9 KISS FM", relaunching with a similar "Flashback Weekend" to the one that signed off "Kiss" two years prior. For a short time it kept the WNWW call letters. On August 1, 2014, WNWW changed call letters to WKSL which were originally used on sister station WNCB-FM in Raleigh, North Carolina.

Notable Past & Present Personalities

 Skip Kelly
 MJ in the Morning
 Elvis Duran and the KISS FM Morning Show
 Mack at Nite, now at WMIA-FM
 Nick Wize, now at WFLZ-FM
 Colt, now at KDWB
 Catalina
 Spoon
 JR

References

External links
 Official Website
2000 Debut of "97.9 KISS FM"

KSL
Contemporary hit radio stations in the United States
IHeartMedia radio stations
1965 establishments in Florida
Radio stations established in 1965